Slavko Banduka (25 February 1947 – 19 June 1992) was a Bosnian Serb footballer who played for FK Partizan.

He was killed as a member of the Army of Republika Srpska on 19 June 1992 in Nedžarići, Sarajevo during the war there.

References

1947 births
1992 deaths
Footballers from Sarajevo
Serbs of Bosnia and Herzegovina
Serbian footballers
Yugoslav footballers
Army of Republika Srpska soldiers
Military personnel killed in the Bosnian War
Association football goalkeepers
Yugoslav First League players
FK Partizan players